

List of Provincial, Colonial and Federal Heads of Eritrea

(Dates in italics indicate de facto continuation of office.)

List of rulers

List of Ottoman governors of Egypt (1517–1805)
List of Ottoman governors of Egypt

List of monarchs of the Muhammad Ali dynasty (1805–1914)

List of Grand Viziers of Egypt (1857–1878) 

 Zulfiqar Pasha (1857–1858) (1st term)
 Mustafa Naili (1858–1861)
 Zulfiqar Pasha (1861–1864) (2nd term)
 Raghib Pasha (1864–1866) (1st term)
 Muhammad Sharif Pasha (1866–1867) (1st term)
 Raghib Pasha (1867–1868) (2nd term)
 Muhammad Sharif Pasha (1868–1872) (2nd term)
 Nubar Pasha (1872)
 Muhammad Tawfiq Pasha (1872–1878)

Habesh Eyaleti (Ottoman Province of Habesh) / Massawa Province

Wali = Governor

Eritrea

List 
Before the official creation of Italian Eritrea (Colonia Eritrea) in 1890, the territory had seven interim governors: Giovanni Branchi (1882 to 1885), Alessandro Caimi (1885), Tancredi Saletta (1885),  Matteo Albertone (1886 to 1887), Tancredi Saletta (1887), Alessandro Di San Marzano (1888) and Antonio Baldissera (1889).

Complete list of Italian Governors of Eritrea:

From 1936, the colony of Eritrea was increased in size and called Eritrea Governorate, as part of Africa Orientale Italiana (AOI). The Italian governors were under direct orders of the Viceroy (representing the now-King and Emperor Vittorio Emanuele)

List of Chief Executives of Eritrea (1941–1960)

Eritrea Governor-General

See also
Eritrea
List of heads of state of Eritrea
Chief Executive of Eritrea
Lists of office-holders

References

External links
Eritrea – World Statesmen

History of Eritrea
Political history of Eritrea
Colonial governors
Eritrea